The 2011 Good Sam RV Insurance 500 was a NASCAR Sprint Cup Series stock car race held on August 7, 2011 at Pocono Raceway in Long Pond, Pennsylvania. Contested over 200 laps on the 2.5-mile (4.0 km) asphalt triangular oval, it was the 21st race of the 2011 Sprint Cup Series season. Brad Keselowski of Penske Racing won the race, while brothers Kyle and Kurt Busch finished second and third respectively.

Report

Background

Pocono Raceway is one of six superspeedways to hold NASCAR races, the others being Michigan International Speedway, Auto Club Speedway, Daytona International Speedway, Indianapolis Motor Speedway and Talladega Superspeedway. The first turn at the track is banked at 14 degrees, and the second is banked at 8 degrees. The final corner is at 6 degree banking, while the straightaways each have 2 degrees of banking. The racetrack has seats for 76,812 spectators.

References

Good Sam RV Insurance 500
Good Sam RV Insurance 500
2011 Good Sam RV Insurance 500
August 2011 sports events in the United States